Jasminum laurifolium, the angel-wing jasmine, is a species of flowering plant in the genus Jasminum, native to the Himalayas, Nepal, Assam, Bangladesh, Tibet, south-central and southeast China, Hainan, Myanmar, and Thailand. Its putative form Jasminum laurifolium f. nitidum has gained the Royal Horticultural Society's Award of Garden Merit.

Varieties
The following varieties are currently accepted:

Jasminum laurifolium var. brachylobum Kurz
Jasminum laurifolium var. laurifolium

References

laurifolium
Plants described in 1819